Jakub Hromada (born 25 May 1996) is a Slovak footballer who plays for Slavia Prague and the Slovak national team as a midfielder.

Club career

Senica
On 12 August 2015, Senica signed two-year loan with Hromada from Sampdoria. He made his professional Fortuna liga debut for Senica against Slovan Bratislava on 15 August 2015.

Viktoria Plzeň
On 23 June 2016, Hromada signed one-year loan with option to buy from Sampdoria.

Slavia Prague
On 20 June 2017, Hromada signed for Slavia Prague, although the transfer rumours were on for most of June. At the time of the signing Hromada was expected to be at 2017 UEFA European Under-21 Championship in Poland, but had to withdraw a couple of days before its commencement, due to a knee injury. On 9 May 2018 he played as Slavia Prague won the 2017-18 Czech Cup final against Jablonec.

International career
In March 2021, Hromada was first called up to Slovak senior national team by Štefan Tarkovič for three 2022 FIFA World Cup qualification fixtures against Cyprus, Malta and Russia.

After being benched for the two upsetting ties against Cyprus (away, 0:0) and Malta (home, 2:2), Štefan Tarkovič granted Hromada his international debut on 30 March 2021 in a crucial qualifier against Russia, which could have seen Slovakia's chances of qualification practically diminish after first set of fixtures. Somewhat surprisingly, Hromada debuted in the starting-XI and saw Slovakia take a lead in the first half through a header by Milan Škriniar. He was booked with a yellow card in first-half injury time, following a foul on Rifat Zhemaletdinov. Hromada was replaced after 60 minutes of play by Patrik Hrošovský. In his absence, Russia equalised through Fernandes, but Róbert Mak sealed Slovak 2:1 victory soon after. After his debut, Hromada was praised for exhibition of "modern football", defensive anticipation, rebound collection, ball exportation and speed.

Career statistics

Club

References

External links
  
 
 FK Senica official profile 
 Futbalnet profile 

1996 births
Living people
Sportspeople from Košice
Slovak footballers
Slovak expatriate footballers
Slovakia youth international footballers
Slovakia under-21 international footballers
Slovakia international footballers
Association football midfielders
U.C. Sampdoria players
FK Senica players
FC Viktoria Plzeň players
SK Slavia Prague players
FC Slovan Liberec players
Slovak Super Liga players
Czech First League players
UEFA Euro 2020 players
Expatriate footballers in Italy
Expatriate footballers in the Czech Republic
Slovak expatriate sportspeople in Italy
Slovak expatriate sportspeople in the Czech Republic